= Nathan Walsh =

English painter

- Born: 1972 (age 53–54); Lincoln, United Kingdom
- Education: MFA, University of Hull; BFA, University of Liverpool
- Known for: Contemporary Realist Painting

Nathan Walsh (born in 1972) is a contemporary realist painter living and working in Wales, United Kingdom. While he paints in his studio in Wales, he travels abroad to large cities like New York to research his compositions.

== Paintings ==
Walsh spends days becoming familiar with the ever-changing city landscape in any major city that he visits. He sketches the basic composition of each painting on a postcard-sized piece of paper. Then, he photographs specific areas of the city that he chooses to paint. When he returns to his studio in Wales, he compiles as many as 1000 images to prepare a verist composition for a new painting. His underpaintings are very intricate and architectural. This results in colossal paintings measuring up to 9 feet in width.

== Repentir App ==
Walsh's intricate painting process is documented in an app called Repentir. The app works with his paintings, Transamerica (2013) and 23 Skidoo (2013). With the app, the user can take a photo of any, or the entire, painting and rewind the painting in time down to the underdrawing.
